Hazem Abdel-Azim (or Hazim Abdelazim) (born 1960) is a prominent Egyptian government opponent. In 2007, he was a senior adviser to the telecommunications minister under then-President Hosni Mubarak. He is known as an activist.

References

Living people
Egyptian activists
Year of birth missing (living people)